Thomas J. Archdeacon (born 5 July 1942) is an American historian.

Archdeacon served on the United States Army Reserve from 1964 to 1978, and was on active duty between 1969 and 1972. He graduated from Fordham University in 1964, and pursued graduate study at Columbia University. Archdeacon began teaching at the United States Military Academy in 1969, prior to joining the University of Wisconsin–Madison faculty in 1972. He was awarded a Guggenheim fellowship in 1985.

Books

References

1942 births
Living people
20th-century American male writers
20th-century American historians
American male non-fiction writers
University of Wisconsin–Madison faculty
United States Military Academy faculty
United States Army reservists
Fordham University alumni
Columbia University alumni